Berkararlyk District is a borough of Aşgabat in Turkmenistan. As a borough, it is headed by a presidentially appointed mayor. 

Boundaries of Berkararlyk District in OpenStreetMap

Etymology
The word berkarar in Turkmen means "stable, strong" with a connotative meaning "steadfast". The Turkic suffix -lyk denotes "state of being", i.e., "steadfastness, stability, strength".

Places of interest
Turkmen State Institute of Architecture and Construction

See also
 Ashgabat
 Districts of Turkmenistan

References

Districts of Turkmenistan